Alejandro René Bejarano Sajama (born June 21, 1984) is an Argentine Naturalized Bolivian footballer currently playing for Club Always Ready in the Liga de Futbol Profesional Boliviano.

Club title

External links
 
 

1984 births
Living people
Sportspeople from Jujuy Province
Naturalized citizens of Bolivia
Argentine emigrants to Bolivia
Association football midfielders
Argentine footballers
Bolivian footballers
Club San José players
C.D. Jorge Wilstermann players
The Strongest players
Universitario de Sucre footballers
Argentine expatriate footballers
Expatriate footballers in Bolivia
Club Always Ready players